Tulsa is the second-largest city in the state of Oklahoma and 47th-most populous city in the United States. The population was 413,066 as of the 2020 census. It is the principal municipality of the Tulsa metropolitan area, a region with 1,023,988 residents. The city serves as the county seat of Tulsa County, the most densely populated county in Oklahoma, with urban development extending into Osage, Rogers, and Wagoner counties.

Tulsa was settled between 1828 and 1836 by the Lochapoka Band of Creek Native American tribe and most of Tulsa is still part of the territory of the Muscogee (Creek) Nation.

Historically, a robust energy sector fueled Tulsa's economy; however, today the city has diversified and leading sectors include finance, aviation, telecommunications and technology. Two institutions of higher education within the city have sports teams at the NCAA Division I level: Oral Roberts University and the University of Tulsa. As well, the University of Oklahoma has a secondary campus at the Tulsa Schusterman Center, and Oklahoma State University has a secondary campus located in downtown Tulsa. For most of the 20th century, the city held the nickname "Oil Capital of the World" and played a major role as one of the most important hubs for the American oil industry.

It is situated on the Arkansas River between the Osage Hills and the foothills of the Ozark Mountains in northeast Oklahoma, a region of the state known as "Green Country". Considered the cultural and arts center of Oklahoma, Tulsa houses two art museums, full-time professional opera and ballet companies, and one of the nation's largest concentrations of art deco architecture.

History 

The area where Tulsa now exists is considered Indian Territory, on the land of the Kiikaapoi (Kickapoo), Wahzhazhe Ma zha (Osage), Muscogee (Creek), and Caddo tribes, among others, before it was first formally settled by the Lochapoka and Creek tribes in 1836. They established a small settlement under the Creek Council Oak Tree at the present-day intersection of Cheyenne Avenue and 18th Street. This area and this tree reminded Chief Tukabahchi and his small group of the Trail of Tears survivors of the bend in the river and their previous Creek Council Oak Tree back in the Tallassee, Alabama area. They named their new settlement Tallasi, meaning "old town" in Creek, which later became "Tulsa". The area around Tulsa was also settled by members of the other so-called "Five Civilized Tribes" who had been relocated to Oklahoma from the Southern United States. Most of modern Tulsa is located in the Creek Nation, with parts located in the Cherokee and Osage Nations.

Although Oklahoma was not yet a state during the Civil War, the Tulsa area saw its share of fighting. The Battle of Chusto-Talasah took place on the north side of Tulsa and several battles and skirmishes took place in nearby counties. After the War, the tribes signed Reconstruction treaties with the federal government that in some cases required substantial land concessions. In the years after the Civil War and around the turn of the century, the area along the Arkansas River that is now Tulsa was periodically home to or visited by a series of colorful outlaws, including the legendary Wild Bunch, the Dalton Gang, and Little Britches.

In 2020, the Supreme Court ruled that much of eastern Oklahoma, including much of Tulsa, falls in the category of Indian Country, reshaping much of the legal jurisdiction in the region. The Muscogee (Creek), Cherokee, Chickasaw, Choctaw, and Seminole tribal communities welcomed the decision as a long-fought for victory.

Incorporation and "Oil Capital" prosperity
Around August 1, 1882, the town was almost centered at a location just north of the current Whittier Square, when a construction crew laying out the line of the St. Louis-San Francisco Railroad chose that spot for a sidetrack.  However, an area merchant persuaded them to move the site further west into the Muscogee Nation, which had friendlier laws for white business owners.  On January 18, 1898, Tulsa was officially incorporated and elected Edward Calkins as the city's first mayor.

Tulsa was still a micro town near the banks of the Arkansas River in 1901 when its first oil well, named Sue Bland No. 1, was established. Much of the oil was discovered on land whose mineral rights were owned by members of the Osage Nation under a system of headrights. By 1905, the discovery of the grand Glenn Pool Oil Reserve (located approximately 15 miles south of downtown Tulsa and site of the present-day town of Glenpool) prompted a rush of entrepreneurs to the area's growing number of oil fields; Tulsa's population swelled to over 140,000 between 1901 and 1930. Unlike the early settlers of Northeastern Oklahoma, who most frequently migrated from the South and Texas, many of these new oil-driven settlers came to Tulsa from the commercial centers of the East Coast and lower Midwest. This migration distinguished the city's demographics from neighboring communities (Tulsa has larger and more prominent Catholic and Jewish populations than most Oklahoma cities) and is reflected in the designs of early Tulsa's upscale neighborhoods.

Known as the "Oil Capital of the World" for most of the 20th century, the city's success in the energy industry prompted construction booms in the popular Art Deco style of the time. Profits from the oil industry continued through the Great Depression, helping the city's economy fare better than most in the United States during the 1930s.

In 1923, Harwelden was built by oil baron E. P. Harwell and his wife Mary, and is an example of prosperity in Tulsa, Oklahoma in the 1920s.

1921 race massacre

In the early 20th century, Tulsa was home to the "Black Wall Street", one of the most prosperous Black communities in the United States at the time. Located in the Greenwood neighborhood, it was the site of the Tulsa Race Massacre, said to be "the single worst incident of racial violence in American history", in which mobs of White Tulsans killed Black Tulsans, looted and robbed the Black community, and burned down homes and businesses. Sixteen hours of massacring on May 31 and June 1, 1921, ended only when National Guardsmen were brought in by the governor. An official report later claimed that 23 Black and 16 White citizens were killed, but other estimates suggest as many as 300 people died, most of them Black. Over 800 people were admitted to local hospitals with injuries, and an estimated 1,000 Black people were left homeless as 35 city blocks, composed of 1,256 residences, were destroyed by fire. Efforts to obtain reparations for survivors of the violence have been unsuccessful, but the events were re-examined by the city and state in the early 21st century, acknowledging the terrible actions that had taken place.

20th century

In 1925, Tulsa businessman Cyrus Avery, known as the "Father of Route 66," began his campaign to create a road linking Chicago to Los Angeles by establishing the U.S. Highway 66 Association in Tulsa, earning the city the nickname the "Birthplace of Route 66". Once completed, U.S. Route 66 took an important role in Tulsa's development as the city served as a popular rest stop for travelers, who were greeted by Route 66 icons such as the Meadow Gold Sign and the Blue Whale of Catoosa. During this period, Bob Wills and his group, The Texas Playboys, began their long performing stint at a small ballroom in downtown Tulsa. In 1935, Cain's Ballroom became the base for the group, which is largely credited for creating Western Swing music. The venue continued to attract famous musicians through its history, and is still in operation today.

For the rest of the mid-20th century, the city had a master plan to construct parks, churches, museums, rose gardens, improved infrastructure, and increased national advertising. The Spavinaw Dam, built during this era to accommodate the city's water needs, was considered one of the largest public works projects of the era.

A national recession greatly affected the city's economy in 1982, as areas of Texas and Oklahoma heavily dependent on oil suffered the freefall in gas prices due to a glut, and a mass exodus of oil industries. Tulsa, heavily dependent on the oil industry, was one of the hardest-hit cities by the fall of oil prices. By 1992, the state's economy had fully recovered, but leaders worked to expand into sectors unrelated to oil and energy.

21st century
In 2003, the "Vision 2025" program was approved by voters, to enhance and revitalize Tulsa's infrastructure and tourism industry. The keystone project of the initiative, the BOK Center, was designed to be a home for the city's minor league hockey and arena football teams, as well as a venue for major concerts and conventions. The multi-purpose arena, designed by famed architect Cesar Pelli, broke ground in 2005 and was opened on August 30, 2008.

In July 2020 the Supreme Court ruled in McGirt v. Oklahoma that as it pertains to criminal law much of eastern Oklahoma, including Tulsa, remains as Native American lands. Specifically, prosecution of crimes by Native Americans on these lands falls into the jurisdiction of the tribal courts and federal judiciary under the Major Crimes Act, rather than Oklahoma's courts.

Geography 

Tulsa is located in the northeastern corner of Oklahoma between the edge of the Great Plains and the foot of the Ozarks in a generally forested region of rolling hills. The city touches the eastern extent of the Cross Timbers, an ecoregion of forest and prairie transitioning from the drier plains of the west to the wetter forests of the east. With a wetter climate than points westward, Tulsa serves as a gateway to "Green Country", a popular and official designation for northeast Oklahoma that stems from the region's green vegetation and relatively large number of hills and lakes compared to central and western areas of Oklahoma, which lie largely in the drier Great Plains region of the Central United States. Located near the western edge of the U.S. Interior Highlands, northeastern Oklahoma is the most topographically diverse part of the state, containing seven of Oklahoma's 11 eco-regions and more than half of its state parks. The region encompasses 30 lakes or reservoirs and borders the neighboring states of Kansas, Missouri, and Arkansas.

Topography
The city developed on both sides of the prominent Arkansas River, which flows in a wide, sandy-bottomed channel. Its flow through the Tulsa area is controlled by upstream flood control reservoirs, but its width and depth can vary widely throughout the year, such as during periods of high rainfall or severe drought. A low-water dam was built to maintain a full channel at all times in the area adjacent to downtown Tulsa. This portion of the river was known as Zink Lake. However, the City of Tulsa allowed the dam to deteriorate and it no longer functions to retain the lake for which it was designed.

Heavily wooded and with abundant parks and water areas, the city has several prominent hills, such as "Shadow Mountain" and "Turkey Mountain", which create varied terrain, especially in its southern portions. While its central and northern sections are generally flat to gently undulating, the Osage Hills extension into the northwestern part of the city further varies the landscape.

Cityscape

Architecture

A building boom in Tulsa in the early 20th century coincided with the rise of art deco architecture in the United States. Most commonly in the zigzag and streamline styles, the city's art deco is dotted throughout its older neighborhoods, primarily in downtown and midtown. A collection of large art deco structures such as the Mid-Continent Tower, the Boston Avenue Methodist Church, Will Rogers High School, and the Philtower, have attracted events promoting the preservation and architectural interest.

In addition, the city's early prosperity funded the construction of many elegant Craftsmen, Georgian, storybook, Tudor, Greek Revival, Italianate, Spanish revival, and colonial revival homes (many of which can be found in Tulsa's uptown and Midtown neighborhoods). Noted architects and firms working in Tulsa during this period include Charles Dilbeck, John Duncan Forsyth, and Nelle Peters.

Growth in the twentieth century gave the city a larger base of contemporary architectural styles, including several buildings by famed Tulsa architects Bruce Goff and Adah Robinson. The Prairie School was very influential in Tulsa: Barry Byrne designed Tulsa's Christ the King Church and, in 1927, Frank Lloyd Wright's midtown Tulsa residential project Westhope was completed. In particular, the middle of the 20th century brought a wealth of modern architecture to Tulsa. Tulsa's Mies-trained modernist Robert Lawton Jones designed many buildings in the region, including the Tulsa International Airport. Other noted modernists working in Tulsa include the pioneering Texas architect O'Neil Ford and Joseph R. Koberling Jr., who had also been active during the art deco period. South, East, and Midtown Tulsa are home to a number of the ranch and Mid-Century Modern homes that reflect Tulsa's prosperous post-war period.

The BOK Tower, built during this period, is the second tallest building in Oklahoma and the surrounding states of Missouri, New Mexico, Arkansas, and Kansas. Tulsa also has the third-, and fourth-tallest buildings in the state, including the Cityplex Tower, which is located in South Tulsa across from Oral Roberts University, far from downtown. One of the area's unique architectural complexes, Oral Roberts University, is built in a Post-Modern Futuristic style, incorporating bright gold structures with sharp, jetting edges and clear geometric shapes. The BOK Center, Tulsa's new arena, incorporates many of the city's most prominent themes, including Native American, art deco, and contemporary architectural styles. Intended to be an architectural icon, the building was designed by César Pelli, the architect of the Petronas Towers in Malaysia.

Neighborhoods

Downtown Tulsa is an area of approximately  surrounded by an inner-dispersal loop created by Interstate 244, Highway 64, and Highway 75. The area serves as Tulsa's financial and business district, and is the focus of a large initiative to draw tourism, which includes plans to capitalize on the area's historic architecture. Much of Tulsa's convention space is located in downtown, such as the Tulsa Performing Arts Center, the Tulsa Convention Center, and the BOK Center. Prominent downtown sub-districts include the Blue Dome District, the Brady Arts district, the "Oil Capital Historic District", the Greenwood Historical District, Owen Park Historical Neighborhood, and the site of ONEOK Field, a baseball stadium for the Tulsa Drillers opened in 2010.

The city's historical residential core lies in an area known as Midtown, containing upscale neighborhoods built in the early 20th century with architecture ranging from art deco to Greek Revival. The University of Tulsa, the Swan Lake neighborhood, Philbrook Museum, and the upscale shopping districts of Utica Square, Cherry Street, and Brookside are located in this region. A large portion of the city's southern half has developed since the 1970s, containing low-density housing and retail developments. This region, marked by secluded homes and suburban neighborhoods, contains one of the state's largest shopping malls, Woodland Hills Mall, as well as Southern Hills Country Club, and Oral Roberts University. East of Highway 169 and north of 61st street, a diverse racial makeup marks the eastern portions of the city, with large Asian and Mexican communities and much of the city's manufacturing industry.

Areas of Tulsa west of the Arkansas River are called West Tulsa and are marked by large parks, wilderness reserves, and large oil refineries. The northern tier of the city is home to OSU-Tulsa, Gilcrease Museum, Tulsa International Airport, the Tulsa Zoo, the Tulsa Air and Space Museum, and the nation's third-largest municipal park, Mohawk Park.

Walkability
In 2016, Walk Score ranked Tulsa the 34th "most walkable"  out of 141 U.S. cities with a population greater than 200,000.

Bicycling
Tulsa has a number of cycling trails, and has installed protected bike lanes in parts of the downtown area.  Additional efforts to expand this infrastructure have been included as part of the city's "GoPlan".

Climate
Average monthly precipitation is lowest from December to February, and peaks dramatically in May, which averages  of rainfall. Early June can still be wet, but late June through the end of August is frequently dry. On average, Tulsa experiences a secondary rainfall peak in September and early October. As is typical of temperate zones, weather patterns vary by season with occasional extremes in temperature and rainfall.

Primarily in the spring and early summer months, the city is subjected to severe thunderstorms containing large hail, damaging winds, and, occasionally, tornadoes, providing the area with a disproportionate share of its annual rainfall. Severe weather is not limited to this season, however. For instance, on December 5, 1975, and on December 24, 1982, Tulsa experienced tornadoes. Due to its potential for major flooding events, the city has developed one of the most extensive flood control systems in the nation. A comprehensive flood management plan was developed in 1984 following a severe flood caused by a stalled weather front that dropped  of rain overnight, killing 14, injuring 288, and destroying 7,000 buildings totaling  in damage. In the early 1990s and again in 2000, the Federal Emergency Management Agency honored Tulsa as leading the nation in flood plain management.
Lack of air circulation due to heat and humidity during the summer months leads to higher concentrations of ozone, prompting the city to release "Ozone Alerts", encouraging all parties to do their part in complying with the Clean Air Act and United States Environmental Protection Agency standards. The autumn season is usually short, consisting of pleasant, sunny days followed by cool nights. Winter temperatures, while generally mild, dip below  on 3 nights, and occasionally below , the most recent such occurrence being a  reading on February 16, 2021. The record for the highest seasonal snowfall is 26.1 inches (66.3 cm) set in the winter of 2010–2011. Only three winters on record have officially recorded trace amounts or no snowfall, the most recent being 1910–11.

August 6, 2017 tornado

An EF2 tornado struck Tulsa early on the morning of Sunday, August 6, 2017. The funnel touched down just after 1 A.M. near 36th Street and Harvard Avenue, then travelled in an easterly direction for about six minutes. The heaviest property damage occurred along 41st Street between Yale Avenue and Sheridan Road. Two restaurants, TGI Friday's and Whataburger, were particularly hard hit, with several people being sent to hospitals for treatment. The Whataburger was later bulldozed, and was rebuilt in 2019.

Demographics

According to the 2010 census, Tulsa had a population of 391,906 and the racial and ethnic composition was as follows: White American: 62.6% (57.9% Non-Hispanic Whites); Black, 15.6%; Hispanic or Latino (of any race), 14.1% (11.5% Mexican, 0.4% Puerto Rican, 0.3% Guatemalan, 0.2% Spanish, 0.2% Honduran, 0.2% Salvadoran); some other race, 8.0%; Two or more races, 5.9%; Native American, 5.3%; Asian American, 2.3% (0.5% Hmong, 0.4% Vietnamese, 0.3% Chinese, 0.2% Indian, 0.2% Korean, 0.2% Burmese); and Native Hawaiian and Other Pacific Islander: 0.1%. In the 2020 census, its population increased to 413,066.

As of the 2010 census, there were 391,906 people, 163,975 households, and 95,246 families residing in the city, with a population density of  There were 185,127 housing units at an average density of 982.3 per square mile (379.2/km2). Of 163,975 households, 27% had children under the age of 18 living with them, 38.2% were married couples living together, 14.6% had a female householder with no husband present, and 41.9% were non-families. Of all households, 34.5% are made up of only one person, and 10% had someone living alone who was 65 years of age or older. The average household size was 2.34 people and the average family size was 3.04.

In the city proper, the age distribution was 24.8% of the population under the age of 18, 10.9% from 18 to 24, 29.9% from 25 to 44, 21.5% from 45 to 64, and 12.9% who were 65 years of age or older, while the median age was 34 years. For every 100 females, there were 93.5 males, while for every 100 females over the age of 17 there were 90.4 males. In 2011, the median income for a household in the city was $40,268 and the median income for a family was $51,977. The per capita income for the city was $26,727. About 19.4% of the population were below the poverty line. Of the city's population over the age of 25, 29.8% holds a bachelor's degree or higher, and 86.5% have a high school diploma or equivalent.

Metropolitan area

The Tulsa metropolitan area, or the region immediately surrounding Tulsa with strong social and economic ties to the city, occupies a large portion of the state's northeastern quadrant. It is informally known as "Green Country", a longstanding name adopted by the state's official tourism designation for all of northeastern Oklahoma (its usage concerning the Tulsa Metropolitan Area can be traced to the early part of the 20th century).

The U.S. Census Bureau defines the sphere of the city's influence as the Tulsa metropolitan statistical area (MSA), spanning seven counties: Tulsa, Rogers, Osage, Wagoner, Okmulgee, Pawnee, and Creek. The 2020 U.S. census shows the Tulsa MSA to have 1,015,331 residents The 2020 U.S. census shows the Tulsa-Muscogee-Bartlesville CSA to have 1,134,125 residents.

Religion
Tulsa has a large conservative following, with the majority of Tulsans being Christians. The second-largest religion in Tulsa is Islam, followed by Buddhism and Judaism.

Tulsa is part of the Southern region demographers and commentators refer to as the "Bible Belt," where Protestant and, in particular, Southern Baptist and other evangelical Christian traditions are very prominent. In fact, Tulsa, home to Oral Roberts University, Phillips Theological Seminary, and RHEMA Bible Training College (in the suburb of Broken Arrow), is sometimes called the "buckle of the Bible Belt". Beyond Oral Roberts and Kenneth E. Hagin, a number of prominent Protestant Christians have lived or studied in Tulsa, including Joel Osteen, Carlton Pearson, Kenneth Copeland, Billy Joe Daugherty, Smokie Norful and Billy James Hargis. Mother Grace Tucker was an Evangelical pastor who ministered to Tulsa's poor and homeless for over fifty years. Tulsa is also home to a number of vibrant Mainline Protestant congregations. Some of these congregations were founded during the oil boom of the early twentieth century and are noted for striking architecture, such as the art deco Boston Avenue Methodist Church and First Presbyterian Church of Tulsa. The metropolitan area has at least four religious radio stations (KCFO, KNYD, KXOJ, & KPIM), and at least two religious TV stations (KWHB & KGEB).

While the state of Oklahoma has fewer Roman Catholics than the national average, Tulsa has a higher percentage owing in large part to the influx of Eastern and Midwestern settlers during the oil boom. Tulsa's Catholic community is atypically prominent for a Southern city and includes Governor and U.S. Senator Dewey F. Bartlett, Congressmen James R. Jones and John A. Sullivan, Governor Frank Keating, U.S. Ambassador to the Holy See Francis Rooney, and Mayors Dewey F. Bartlett, Jr., Robert J. LaFortune, Bill LaFortune and G. T. Bynum. Holy Family Cathedral serves as the Cathedral for the Diocese of Tulsa.

Tulsa is also home to the largest Jewish community in Oklahoma, with active Reform, Conservative and Orthodox congregations. Tulsa's Jewish community includes George Kaiser and Lynn Schusterman. Tulsa's Sherwin Miller Museum of Jewish Art offers the largest collection of Judaica in the South-Central and Southwestern United States.

Tulsa is also home to the progressive All Souls Unitarian Church, reportedly the largest Unitarian Universalist congregation in the United States.

Chùa Tam Bào (Vietnamese: "Three Jewels Temple"), Oklahoma's only Buddhist temple, was established in east Tulsa in 1993 by Vietnamese refugees. A  granite statue of Quan Âm  (commonly known by her Chinese name, Guanyin) is located in the grounds.

Economy

Energy industry's legacy and resurgence
The United States Oil and Gas Association was founded in Tulsa on October 13, 1917. Over the city's history many large oil companies have been headquartered in the city, including Warren Petroleum (which merged with Gulf Oil in what was then the largest merger in the energy industry), Skelly Oil, Getty Oil and CITGO. In addition, ConocoPhillips was headquartered in nearby Bartlesville. Industry consolidation and increased offshore drilling threatened Tulsa's status as an oil capital, but new drilling techniques and the rise of natural gas have buoyed the growth of the city's energy sector.

Today, Tulsa is again home to the headquarters of many international oil- and gas-related companies, including Williams Companies, ONE Gas, Syntroleum, ONEOK, Laredo Petroleum, Samson Resources, Helmerich & Payne, Magellan Midstream Partners, and Excel Energy.

Diversification and emerging industries
Tulsa has diversified to capitalize on its status as a regional hub with substantial innovation assets. In 2006, Forbes magazine rated Tulsa as second in the nation in income growth, and one of the best cities in the country to do business with. Usually among the lowest in the nation in terms of cost of doing business, the Tulsa Metropolitan Area in 2005 was rated among the five lowest metropolitan areas in the United States for that category.

Tulsa's primary employers are small and medium-sized businesses: there are 30 companies in Tulsa that employ more than 1,000 people locally, and small businesses make up more than 80% of the city's companies.

During a national recession from 2001 to 2003, the city lost 28,000 jobs. In response, a development initiative, Vision 2025, promised to incite economic growth and recreate lost jobs. Projects spurred by the initiative promised urban revitalization, infrastructure improvement, tourism development, riverfront retail development, and further diversification of the economy. By 2007, employment levels had surpassed pre-recession heights and the city was in a significant economic development and investment surge. This economic improvement is also seen in Tulsa's housing trends which show an average of a 6% increase in rent in 2010. Since 2006, more than 28,000 jobs have been added to the city. The unemployment rate of Tulsa in August 2014 was 4.5%.

Though the oil industry has historically dominated Tulsa's economy, efforts in economic diversification have created a base in the sectors of aerospace, finance, technology, telecommunications, high tech, and manufacturing. A number of substantial financial corporations are headquartered in Tulsa, the largest being the BOK Financial Corporation. Among these financial services firms are energy trading operations, asset management firms, investment funds, and a range of commercial banks. The national convenience store chain QuikTrip, fast-casual restaurant chain Camille's Sidewalk Cafe, and pizza chain Mazzio's are all headquartered in Tulsa, as is Southern regional BBQ restaurant Rib Crib. Tulsa is also home to the Marshall Brewing Company.

Tulsa is also home to a burgeoning media industry, including PennWell, consumer review website ConsumerAffairs, Stephens Media Group, This Land Press, Educational Development Corporation (the parent publisher of Kane/Miller), GEB America, Blooming Twig Books, and a full range of local media outlets, including Tulsa World and local magazines, radio and television. Tulsa is also a hub for national construction and engineering companies including Manhattan Construction Company and Flintco. A number of the Cherokee Nation Businesses are also headquartered or have substantial operations in Tulsa.

Tulsa's aerospace industry is substantial and growing. An American Airlines maintenance base at Tulsa International Airport is the city's largest employer and the largest maintenance facility in the world, serving as the airline's global maintenance and engineering headquarters.  American Airlines announced in February, 2020 that it will pour $550 million over seven years into its maintenance base, this being the largest single economic development investment in city history.  The Tulsa Port of Catoosa and the Tulsa International Airport house extensive transit-focused industrial parks. Tulsa is also home to a division of Lufthansa, the headquarters of Omni Air International, and the Spartan College of Aeronautics and Technology.

Tulsa is also part of the Oklahoma-South Kansas Unmanned Aerial Systems (drone) industry cluster, a region which awarded funding by the U.S. Small Business Administration to build on its progress as a hub this emerging industry.

As the second largest metropolitan area in Oklahoma and a hub for the growing Northeastern Oklahoma-Northwest Arkansas-Southwestern Missouri corridor, the city is also home to a number of the region's most sophisticated law, accounting, and medical practices. Its location in the center of the nation also makes it a hub for logistics businesses; the Tulsa International Airport (TUL) and the Tulsa Port of Catoosa, connect the region with international trade and transportation.

Amazon recently announced plans to build a more than 600,000-square-foot fulfillment center near Tulsa International Airport. The company will invest an estimated $130 million for this state-of-the-art facility, which will employ around 1,500 people with an annual payroll of roughly $50 million.

Culture
Tulsa culture is influenced by the nearby Southwest, Midwest, and Southern cultural regions, as well as a historical Native American presence. These influences are expressed in the city's museums, cultural centers, performing arts venues, ethnic festivals, park systems, zoos, wildlife preserves, and large and growing collections of public sculptures, monuments, and artwork.

Museums, archives and visual culture
Tulsa is home to several museums. Located in the former villa of oil pioneer Waite Phillips in Midtown Tulsa, the Philbrook Museum of Art is considered one of the top 50 fine art museums in the United States and is one of only five to offer a combination of a historic home, formal gardens, and an art collection. The museum's expansive collection includes work by a diverse group of artists including Pablo Picasso, Andrew Wyeth, Giovanni Bellini, Domenico di Pace Beccafumi, Willem de Kooning, William Merritt Chase, Auguste Rodin and Georgia O'Keeffe. Philbrook also maintains a satellite campus in downtown Tulsa.

In the Osage Hills of Northwest Tulsa, the Gilcrease Museum holds the world's largest, most comprehensive collection of art and artifacts of the American West. The museum includes the extensive collection of Native American oilman and famed art collector Thomas Gilcrease with numerous works by Frederic Remington, Thomas Moran, Albert Bierstadt and John James Audubon among the many displayed.

On the west bank of the Arkansas River in the suburb of Jenks, the Oklahoma Aquarium is the state's only freestanding aquarium, containing over 200 exhibits, including a shark tank.

In addition, the city hosts a number of galleries, experimental art-spaces, smaller museums, and display spaces located throughout the city (clustered mostly in downtown, Brookside, and the Pearl District). Living Arts of Tulsa, in downtown Tulsa, is among the organizations dedicated to promoting and sustaining an active arts scene in the city.

Cultural and historical archives
Opened in April 2013, the Woody Guthrie Center in the Tulsa Arts District is Tulsa's newest museum and archive. In addition to interactive state-of-the-art museum displays, the Woody Guthrie Center also houses the Woody Guthrie Archives, containing thousands of Guthrie's personal items, sheet music, manuscripts, books, photos, periodicals, and other items associated with the iconic Oklahoma native. The archives of Guthrie protégé, singer-songwriter Bob Dylan will also be displayed in Tulsa when a new facility designed to showcase The Bob Dylan Archive is completed.

The Church Studio is a recording studio and tourist attraction with an archive of more than 5,000 pieces. Constructed in 1915, the church was listed on the National Register of Historic Places due to the late musician Leon Russell, who turned the old church into a recording studio and office to Shelter Records in 1972.

With remnants of the Holocaust and artifacts relevant to Judaism in Oklahoma, the Sherwin Miller Museum of Jewish Art preserves the largest collection of Judaica in the Southwestern and South-Central United States. Other museums, such as the Tulsa Historical Society, the Tulsa Air and Space Museum & Planetarium, the Oklahoma Jazz Hall of Fame, and the Tulsa Geosciences Center, document histories of the region, while the Greenwood Cultural Center preserves the culture of the city's African American heritage, housing a collection of artifacts and photography that document the history of the Black Wall Street before the Tulsa Race Riot of 1921.

Public art

Since 1969, public displays of artwork in Tulsa have been funded by one percent of its annual city budget. Each year, a sculpture from a local artist is installed along the Arkansas River trail system, while other sculptures stand at local parks, such as an enlarged version of Cyrus Dallin's Appeal to the Great Spirit sculpture at Woodward Park. As a testament to the city's oil heritage, the  Golden Driller guards the front entrance to the Tulsa County Fairgrounds. Tulsa has a number of exhibits related to U.S. Route 66, including The Cyrus Avery Centennial Plaza, located next to the east entrance of the historic 11th Street Bridge. The Plaza contains a giant sculpture weighing  and costing $1.178 million called "East Meets West" of the Avery family riding west in a Model T Ford meeting an eastbound horse-drawn carriage. In 2020, Avery Plaza Southwest is scheduled to open, at the west end of the bridge, and should include replicas of three neon signs from Tulsa-area Route 66 motels from the era, being the Will Rogers Motor Court. Tulsa Auto Court, and the Oil Capital Motel. Tulsa has also installed "Route 66 Rising," a  sculpture on the road's eastern approach to town at East Admiral Place and Mingo Road. In addition, Tulsa has constructed twenty-nine historical markers scattered along the  route of the highway through Tulsa, containing tourist-oriented stories, historical photos, and a map showing the location of historical sites and the other markers. The markers are mostly along the highway's post-1932 alignment down 11th Street, with some along the road's 1926 path down Admiral Place.

The largest augmented reality mural in the world, "The Majestic", a  work which adorns two sides of the Main Park Plaza at 410 S. Main downtown, was completed in October 2021.  The $230,000 project was created by Los Angeles-based artists Ryan "Yanoe" Sarfati and Eric "Zoueh" Skotnes.  The mural becomes animated when viewed through a smartphone camera.

Performing arts, film and cultural venues
Tulsa contains several permanent dance, theater, and concert groups, including the Tulsa Ballet, the Tulsa Opera, the Tulsa Symphony Orchestra, Light Opera Oklahoma, Signature Symphony at TCC, the Tulsa Youth Symphony, the Heller Theatre, American Theatre Company, which is a member of the Theatre Communications Group and Oklahoma's oldest resident professional theatre, and Theatre Tulsa, the oldest continuously operating community theatre company west of the Mississippi River. Tulsa also houses the Tulsa Spotlight Theater at Riverside Studio, which shows the longest-running play in America (The Drunkard) every Saturday night. Many of the world's best choreographers have worked with Tulsa Ballet including: Leonide Massine, Antony Tudor, Jerome Robbins, George Balanchine, Paul Taylor, Kurt Jooss, Nacho Duato (ten works), Val Caniparoli who is its resident choreographer (with seven works and four world premieres), Stanton Welch, Young Soon Hue, Ma Cong, Twyla Tharp and many others. 
In April 2008, Tulsa Ballet completed an ambitious $17.3 million integrated campaign, which was celebrated at the opening of the brand new Studio K; an on-site, three hundred-seat performance space dedicated to the creation of new works.

Tulsa's music scene is also famous for the eponymous "Tulsa Sound" which blends rockabilly, country, rock 'n' roll, and blues and has inspired local artists like J.J. Cale and Leon Russell as well as international superstars like Eric Clapton.

A number of concert venues, dance halls, and bars gave rise to the Tulsa Sound but Cain's Ballroom might be the best known. Cain's is considered the birthplace of Western Swing, housed the performance headquarters of Bob Wills and the Texas Playboys during the 1930s. The centerpiece of the downtown Brady Arts District, the Brady Theater, is the largest of the city's five operating performing arts venues that are listed on the National Register of Historic Places.  Its design features extensive contributions by American architect Bruce Goff. The Pearl District features The Church Studio.

Large performing arts complexes include the Tulsa Performing Arts Center, which was designed by World Trade Center architect Minoru Yamasaki, the Cox Business Center, the art deco Expo Square Pavilion, the Mabee Center, the Tulsa Performing Arts Center for Education, and the River Parks Amphitheater and Tulsa's largest venue, the BOK Center. Ten miles west of the city, an outdoor amphitheater called "Discoveryland!" holds the official title of the world performance headquarters for the musical Oklahoma!.

The city's film community hosts annual festivals such as the Tulsa United Film Festival and Tulsa Overground Film and Music Festival.

Outdoor attractions

The city's zoo, the Tulsa Zoo, was voted "America's Favorite Zoo" in 2005 by Microsoft Game Studios in connection with a national promotion of its Zoo Tycoon 2 computer game. The zoo is located in  Mohawk Park (the third largest municipal park in the United States) which also contains the  Oxley Nature Center. 

The Tulsa State Fair, operating in late September and early October, attracts over one million people during its 10-day run. A number of other cultural heritage festivals are held in the city throughout the year, including the Intertribal Indian Club Powwow of Champions in August; Scotfest, India Fest, Greek Festival, and Festival Viva Mexico in September; ShalomFest in October; Dia de Los Muertos Art Festival in November; and the Asian-American Festival in May. The annual Mayfest arts and crafts festival held downtown was estimated to have drawn more than 365,000 people in its four-day run in 2012. On a smaller scale, the city hosts block parties during a citywide "Block Party Day" each year, with festivals varying in size throughout city neighborhoods. Tulsa has one major amusement park attraction, Safari Joe's H2O Water Park (formerly Big Splash Water Park), featuring multi-story water slides, large wave pools, and a reptile exhibit. Until 2006, the city also hosted Bell's Amusement Park, which closed after Tulsa County officials declined to renew its lease agreement.

Music
Western Swing, a musical genre with roots in country music, was made popular at Tulsa's Cain's Ballroom. The Tulsa Sound, a variation of country, blues, rockabilly, blues rock, swamp rock and rock 'n' roll, was started and largely developed by local musicians J. J. Cale and Leon Russell in the 1960s and 1970s. Musicians from Tulsa or who started their musical careers in Tulsa include Elvin Bishop, Jim Keltner,  David Gates, Dwight Twilley, Jesse Ed Davis, Garth Brooks, The Gap Band, St. Vincent, Clyde Stacy, Flash Terry, Hanson, Gus Hardin, Jeff Carson, Billy Reynolds Eustis and the Tri-Lads, Marvin&Johnny, Ronnie Dunn, Jamie Oldaker, Bob Wills(Texas), David Cook, Broncho, Jacob Sartorius, Tyson Meade, John Moreland, John Calvin Abney, The Damn Quails(folk group), Kristin Chenoweth(actress), JD McPherson,  and Wilderado.  The heart of the Tulsa Sound can be found at The Church Studio.
AleXa a representative from Tulsa won American Song Contest

Cuisine
Tulsa restaurants and food trucks offer a number of cuisines, but several cuisines are particularly prominent in its culinary landscape because of its distinctive history.

BBQ
Tulsa is known nationally for its barbecue offerings; its barbecue reflects its midpoint location "between pig country and cow country," that is, in the transition zone between the South and the West. The city's barbecue is also helped by its geography; the wood used in barbecuing is abundant in Northeastern Oklahoma (including pecan, oak, hickory, mesquite and maple). The region's ethnic diversity is felt, too: its BBQ traditions bear the influences of white, African-American and American Indian foodways.
Tulsa is also home to the nationally acclaimed premium smoker manufacturer Hasty-Bake Company. Some Tulsa based barbecue joints have expanded even beyond the state's borders, including Leon's Smoke Shack, Rib Crib and Billy Sims Barbecue. The prize-winning Oklahoma Joe's was founded by Oklahoman Joe Davidson, who mastered his craft at Tulsa's T-Town BBQ Cook-Off.

Oklahoma barbecue is also unique in its emphasis on hickory-smoked baloney, nicknamed "Oklahoma tenderloin," and its fried okra.

Lebanese steakhouses
Lebanese steakhouses were once numerous in the region stretching from Bristow, Oklahoma to Tulsa, but now mostly exist in the Tulsa region. These restaurants were founded by Syrian and Lebanese families who immigrated to Oklahoma before statehood.  Traditionally, many of these restaurants had live entertainment (including performers like Ella Fitzgerald and the Ink Spots) and featured Mediterranean dishes like tabbouleh, rice pilaf and hummus alongside local favorites like smoked BBQ bologna.

Chili and Coney Island hot dogs
Oklahomans have been consuming chili since well before statehood, owing to the influence of Mexican-American culture on the state. In 1910, iconic Tulsa restaurant Ike's Chili Parlor opened and Ivan "Ike" Johnson is purported to have acquired his recipe from a Hispanic-Texan named Alex Garcia.

Greek immigrants to Tulsa who came by way of Brooklyn, Pennsylvania and Michigan brought with them the tradition of Coney Island-style hot dogs with chili on a bun.  Today, a related group of Greek-American families operate Coney restaurants around the city, including Coney I-Lander which opened in 1926 and was described by food writers Jane and Michael Stern as perfectly delivering "the cheap-eats ecstasy that is the Coney's soul".  Many of these restaurants sell Greek food, either year round or at Tulsa's annual Greek Holiday, sponsored by Holy Trinity Greek Orthodox Church (which dates to 1925).

Southern "homestyle" food
By and large, Tulsa's traditional cuisine reflects the influence of Southern foodways, particularly "upland South and... Texas where many of Oklahoma's nineteenth-century population originated." The prominence of certain foods reflects the agricultural heritage of the surrounding regions. For instance, at the suggestion of experts at what is now Oklahoma State University, peanuts became a major crop in now eastern Oklahoma as a means for lessening the reliance on cotton cultivation. Chicken-fried steak is part of the state meal of Oklahoma and is the signature dish at a number of Tulsa restaurants.

Wild onion dinner
The wild onion dinner is a festive gathering that originated with the Southeastern tribes which call Eastern Oklahoma home. The meals often feature wild onion, pork, frybread, corn bread, Poke salad and a unique dish known as grape biscuits. The Tulsa Indian Women's Club has been holding annual Wild Onion Dinners since at least 1932.

Baking and confectionery
Tulsa is home to the Oklahoma Sugar Arts Show, a premier sugar craft competition hosted by Tulsa-based Food Network personality Kerry Vincent. Tulsa is also home to the nationally renowned Pancho Anaya Mexican bakery, recognized by Food & Wine as one of America's 100 best bakeries. Tulsa is home to several national dessert companies: Daylight Donuts was founded in Tulsa and remains headquartered there, as is the Bama Pie Company.

Breweries
Brewing in Tulsa dates back to at least the late 1930s with the Ahrens Brewing Company and their Ranger Beer line. The Ahrens Brewing Company opened in May 1938. Tulsa's craft beer scene has boomed since legislation passed allowing for microbreweries to serve the public directly (Tulsa's first microbrewery in the post-World War II era was Marshall Brewing Company in 2008).

Sports

Tulsa supports a wide array of sports at the professional and collegiate levels. The city hosts two NCAA Division I colleges and multiple professional minor league sports teams in baseball, football, hockey, and soccer. In addition, Tulsa once had a WNBA team, the Tulsa Shock women's professional basketball team.

Professional sports

Tulsa's Class AA Texas League baseball team is called the Tulsa Drillers; famous former Drillers include Sammy Sosa, Matt Holliday, and Iván Rodríguez.

In 2008, Tulsa funded $39.2 million to build a new ballpark in the Greenwood District near downtown for the Drillers. The ground breaking was held on December 19, 2008. The first game at ONEOK Field was held on April 8, 2010. Country music star Tim McGraw threw out the first pitch.

The 19,199-seat BOK Center is the centerpiece of the Vision 2025 projects and was completed in August 2008; the BOK Center was in the top ten among indoor arenas worldwide in ticket sales for the first quarter of 2009 when it was the home for the city's Tulsa Shock WNBA, Tulsa Talons arena football, and Tulsa Oilers ice hockey teams; as of 2022, the Oilers are the sole remaining tenant.

College sports

Two Tulsa universities compete at the NCAA Division I level: the University of Tulsa Golden Hurricane, and the Oral Roberts University Golden Eagles. The University of Tulsa's men's basketball program has reached the Sweet Sixteen three times, made an appearance in the Elite Eight in 2000, won the NIT championship in 1981 and 2001, and won the inaugural College Basketball Invitational in 2008. The Tulsa football team has played in 16 bowl games, including the Sugar Bowl (twice) and the Orange Bowl. Oral Roberts University's men's basketball team reached the Elite Eight in 1974, the Sweet Sixteen in 2021, and won the Mid-Continent Conference title three straight years, from 2005 to 2007.

The University of Tulsa also boasts one of the nation's top tennis facilities, the Michael D. Case Tennis Center, which hosted the 2004 and 2008 NCAA tennis championships. The Golden Hurricane Tennis program has a string of success, including men's Missouri Valley championships in 1995 and 1996, men's Conference USA championships in 2006, 2007, 2008, 2009, and 2011 and women's Conference USA championships in 2007, 2008, 2010, and 2011. In 2007, Tulsa's top-ranked player Arnau Brugués-Davi ranked as high as #1 in the nation and a four time All-American, advanced to the quarterfinals of the singles competition at the NCAA Men's Tennis Championship, improving on his 2006 round of sixteen appearances.

Golf
Tulsa is home to the famous Southern Hills Country Club, which is one of only two courses that have hosted seven men's major championships: three U.S. Opens and four PGA Championships, the most recent in 2022. The course has held five amateur championships and from 2001 to 2008 the LPGA had a regular tour stop, latterly known as the SemGroup Championship at Cedar Ridge Country Club.

Tulsa also hosts two golf courses designed by famed golf course architect A.W. Tillinghast: the Oaks Country Club and Tulsa Country Club. The Tom Fazio-designed Golf Club of Oklahoma is located just outside of Tulsa.

Professional soccer
Tulsa is home to FC Tulsa, which competes in the USL Championship.

From 1978 to 1984, the city hosted the Tulsa Roughnecks, who played in the now-defunct North American Soccer League and won that league's championship in 1983.

Professional football
In 1984, the city hosted the Oklahoma Outlaws of the now-defunct United States Football League for a single season.

High school sports
At the secondary level, the Tulsa area is home to several high school athletic programs that are frequently ranked among the best nationally, particularly in football (e.g. Bixby High School, Broken Arrow High School, Owasso High School, Union High School, Booker T. Washington, and Jenks High School).

Running, biking and trails
The city's running and cycling communities support events such as the Tulsa Tough cycling race, the Hurtland cyclocross, the Route 66 Marathon, and the Tulsa Run, which features over 8000 participants annually. Another popular gambling draw, horse racing events are housed by the Fair Meadows Race Track and Will Rogers Downs in nearby Claremore.

Saint Francis Tulsa Tough Ride and Race is a three-day cycling festival in Tulsa, Oklahoma. It features both non-competitive riding through scenic areas around the Tulsa Metropolitan Area and professional level races. It is held each year on Friday, Saturday, and Sunday, the second weekend in June. Just as popular as the biking itself is the weekend-long festivities at Crybaby Hill, for it is held in the Riverview District. The Blue Dome District hosts its race on the first night and takes riders down East 2nd Street by Arnie's Bar, the Dilly Diner, and El Guapo's Mexican Cantina. The race has participants riding at fast speeds through crowded streets lined with cheering spectators, live music, and several vendors. Events include the Men's Cat 3, Women's Pro 1/2, Men's 1/2 and Men's Pro 1.

Motorsports
In motorsports, Tulsa annually hosts the Chili Bowl indoor race at the Tulsa Expo Center. The race was initially sponsored by the Chili Bowl food company of Bob Berryhill. The race has since accommodated "over two hundred race rigs, bleachers for thousands of people and an ever-growing trade show".

Parks

Woodward Park, a  tract located in midtown Tulsa, doubles as a botanical garden, featuring the Tulsa Municipal Rose Garden, with more than 6,000 rose plants in 250 varieties, and the Linnaeus Teaching Gardens, which demonstrate the latest and most successful techniques for growing vegetables, annuals, perennials, woody plants and groundcovers.

Some Tulsa-area parks are run by Tulsa County Parks.  These include the  LaFortune Park in Midtown Tulsa, and the  Chandler Park.

Some parks are under the Tulsa River Parks Authority. Since 2007 a significant portion of the River Parks area has been renovated with new trails, landscaping, and playground equipment. In addition, after years of planning, generous donations and input from the community,  of central Tulsa was transformed into Gathering Place, a $465 million park that opened September 8, 2018. The project is spearheaded and largely funded by the George Kaiser Family Foundation. With a $100 million endowment for maintenance and family programming from the George Kaiser Family Foundation alone, it one of the largest and most ambitious public parks ever created with private funds. The main attractions are the Chapman Adventure Playground, the Williams Lodge, a boathouse, splash playground, great lawn, outdoor sports courts, a skate park, a wetland pond and garden, and numerous trails among other locations. Tulsa's Gathering Place was named the Best New Attraction in the Nation in 2018 through the USA Today Readers’ Choice awards. Groundbreaking on the anchor project for phase two, Discovery Lab, occurred in February 2020. The $47 million,  Discovery Lab is a hands-on museum also featuring classrooms, a café, grand plaza, and 300-seat amphitheater; it opened on January 24, 2022.

Government

A mayor-council government has been in place in Tulsa since 1989, when the city converted from a city commission government deemed wasteful and less efficient. Since the change, Tulsa mayors have been given more power in accordance with a strong mayoral system and have greater control of a more consolidated array of governmental branches. Plurality voting is used to elect mayors, who serve a term in office of four years. The present mayor of Tulsa is Republican G. T. Bynum, who won the 2016 mayoral election and took office on December 5, 2016. Another Tulsa political figure, Jim Inhofe, who now represents Oklahoma in the United States Senate, served as the mayor of Tulsa early in his political career.

A city councilor from each of the city's nine council districts is elected every two years, each serving a term of two years. Councilors are elected from their own respective districts based on a plurality voting system, and serve on the Tulsa City Council. As a whole, the council acts as the legislative body of the city government, which aims to pass laws, approve the city budget, and manage efficiency in the city government. In accordance with the mayor-council form of government, the Tulsa City Council and the office of the Mayor coordinate in city government operations. A third body of the government, the city auditor, is elected independently of the city council and mayor to ensure that the auditor can act in an objective manner. The auditor is elected for a term of two years. Phil Wood, a Democrat, held the position for 21 years before being defeated by Republican Preston Doerflinger in the 2009 election. The city serves as the seat of county government for Tulsa County, and lies mostly within Oklahoma's 1st congressional district, with its far northwestern areas in southern Osage County in Oklahoma's 3rd congressional district. Municipal and state laws are enforced in Tulsa by the Tulsa Police Department, an organization of 781 officers .

Crime rate

Tulsa experienced elevated levels of gang violence in the late 1980s and early 1990s, when crack cocaine flooded neighborhoods in North Tulsa. Tulsa gang problems became noticeable after an outbreak of gang-related crime between 1980 and 1983, which was traced to the Crips, a local gang which had been founded by two brothers whose family had recently moved to Oklahoma from Compton. In 1986, gang graffiti started to show up on walls and drive-by shootings started occurring on late nights.  In 1990 the city hit a record of 60 homicides, the highest since the 1981 peak. North Tulsa has the highest crime rate in the city, with public housing projects being the most heavily affected areas. On June 1, 2022, a mass shooting occurred in a medical center, killing at least 4 people, including the perpetrator.

Education

K–12 education
The Presbyterian Church (PCUSA) established the Presbyterian Mission Day School, a one-story building at what would become the intersection of 4th Street and Boston Avenue in 1884. A second story was soon added to accommodate the number of children who were to attend. This school operated until 1889. When Tulsa incorporated in 1899, it took over the school, which became the first public school. James M. Hall and three other men bought the property with their own funds and held the title until the city could reimburse them.

Tulsa built its first two public schools in 1905. The construction of more schools began accelerating in 1906. In December 1907, control of the public schools passed from the city government to the Tulsa Board of Education.

Tulsa High School opened in 1906 on the same block formerly occupied by the Presbyterian mission school, which had been razed. The new school was a three-story cream colored brick building with a dome. The school was accredited by the North Central Association of Schools and Colleges in 1913. It proved too small by 1916, when Tulsa voters approved a bond issue to construct a new high school at Sixth Street and Cincinnati Avenue, which was renamed Central High School. The north half of this facility opened in 1917, while the south half opened in 1922. The building remained in this service until 1976, when it was replaced by a new building on West Edison Street. The old building was taken over by the Public Service Company of Oklahoma.

There are three primary public school districts in the city of Tulsa. Tulsa Public Schools, with nine high schools and over 41,000 students, is the second-largest school district in Oklahoma and includes Booker T. Washington High School, a magnet school judged to be the 65th best high school in the United States by Newsweek magazine in 2008. Each with one upper high school, Jenks Public Schools, Union Public Schools and Broken Arrow Public Schools are the city's three other primary districts, covering the southern and far eastern portions of the city near the towns of Jenks and Broken Arrow. In 2006, there were more than 90,000 students attending Tulsa County's public schools.

A variety of independent and sectarian schools exist in Tulsa, also. Most, but not all, of the private schools have religious affiliations with various Christian, Jewish or Muslim denominations. The Catholic Diocese of Tulsa supports a system of parochial and diocesan schools, including Bishop Kelley High School, administered by the LaSallians (French Christian Brothers). Another Catholic high school, Cascia Hall Preparatory School, is administered by Augustinians. Holland Hall School is independent but historically affiliated with the Episcopal Church. Riverfield Country Day School is non-sectarian.

Public libraries
The largest library system in the Tulsa Metropolitan Area, the Tulsa City-County Library, contains over  volumes in 25 library facilities. The library is active in the community, holding events and programs at most branches, including free computer classes, children's storytimes, business and job assistance, and scholarly databases with information on a variety of topics. The McFarlin Library at the University of Tulsa is a federal depository library holding over three million items. Founded in 1930, the library is known for its collection of Native American works and the original works of Irish author James Joyce. The Tulsa City-County Library and the University of Tulsa's Law Library are also federal depository libraries, making Tulsa the only city in Oklahoma with more than two federal depository libraries. The Tulsa City County Library's Downtown branch was massively renovated and opened to the public on Saturday, October 1, 2016.

Higher education

The first institute of higher education was established in Tulsa when Kendall College, a Presbyterian school, moved from Muskogee to Tulsa in 1907. In 1920, the school merged with a proposed McFarlin College to become the University of Tulsa (abbreviated as TU). The McFarlin Library of TU was named for the principal donor of the proposed college, oilman Robert M. McFarlin.

Tulsa has 15 institutions of higher education, including two private universities: the University of Tulsa, a school founded in 1894, and Oral Roberts University, a school founded by evangelist Oral Roberts in 1963.

The University of Tulsa has an enrollment of 3,832 undergraduate and graduate students as of 2021. It is ranked 83rd among national doctoral universities in U.S. News & World Report 2009 edition of America's Best Colleges and among the best 123 Western Colleges by the Princeton Review in 2007, which also ranks it in the top ten schools nationally for quality of life, overall happiness of students, and relationship with the community.  In addition to doctoral and masters programs, TU is home to the University of Tulsa College of Law and the Collins College of Business. TU also manages the famous Gilcrease Museum in northwest Tulsa and hosts the Alexandre Hogue Gallery on its main campus. As of 2022, TU was ranked 137th in national universities by US News and World Report.

Oral Roberts University, a charismatic Christian institution with an enrollment of 5,109 undergraduate and graduate students, was rated in 2007 by the Princeton Review one of the 123 best in the Western United States and among the West's top 50 Master's Universities by U.S. News & World Report in 2005.

Both of the state's flagship research universities have campuses in Tulsa:

 Oklahoma State University houses three campuses in the city, the OSU Center for Health Sciences, the OSU College of Osteopathic Medicine, and OSU – Tulsa, accommodating upper-level undergraduate and graduate courses. OSU-Tulsa has an advanced materials research facility and is home to the Oklahoma Center for Poets and Writers.
 The University of Oklahoma operates what is known as the OU-Tulsa Schusterman Center, offering bachelors, master's, and doctoral degree programs in conjunction with the main campus in Norman and the OU Health Sciences Center in Oklahoma City. The OU-Tulsa Schusterman Center also houses the OU School of Community Medicine, the first medical school of its kind in the United States.

Rogers State University in Claremore, Oklahoma, is the Tulsa area's original public, undergraduate-focused, four-year university. Tulsa Community College (TCC), the largest community college in Oklahoma,  operates four campuses spread across the area as well as a conference center in Midtown, and has a partnership allowing students to complete four-year bachelor's degrees through OU-Tulsa, OSU-Tulsa, LU-Tulsa and NSU-Broken Arrow.  Tulsa also has a Tulsa branch of Langston University, the only historically black college or university in the state, founded in 1897. Tulsa previously had a branch campus of St. Gregory's University, a Catholic university with its main campus in Shawnee, Oklahoma; however, that school went into bankruptcy in 2017.

The Spartan School of Aeronautics enrolls 1,500 students at its flight programs near Tulsa International Airport and the city's vocational education is headed by Tulsa Technology Center, the oldest and largest vocational technology institution in the state.

Among trade schools located in Tulsa are Community Care College (including branches Oklahoma Technical College and Clary Sage College), Holberton School Tulsa, and Tulsa Tech.

Media and communications

Print
Tulsa's leading newspaper is the daily Tulsa World, the second-most widely circulated newspaper in Oklahoma with a Sunday circulation of 189,789.

The Tulsa Voice is an Alt-Weekly newspaper covering entertainment and cultural events. Covering primarily economic events and stocks, the Tulsa Business Journal caters to Tulsa's business sector. Other publications include the Oklahoma Indian Times, the Tulsa Daily Commerce and Legal News, the Tulsa Beacon, This Land Press, and the Tulsa Free Press. The first black-owned newspaper was the Tulsa Star, which ceased publication when its office burned during the Tulsa race massacre. It was succeeded by the Oklahoma Eagle, which began publishing using the press salvaged from the Star office.

Until 1992, the Tulsa Tribune served as a daily afternoon newspaper competing with the Tulsa World. The paper was acquired by the Tulsa World that year. Urban Tulsa Weekly served as the city's alt-weekly paper from 1991 until its closure in 2013.

Television and radio
Tulsa is also served by television and radio broadcasting networks. All major U.S. television networks are represented in Tulsa through local affiliates in the designated market area (a region covering a 22-county area serving the northeastern and east-central portions of Oklahoma, and far southeastern Kansas); these include NBC affiliate KJRH-TV (channel 2), CBS affiliate KOTV-DT (channel 6), ABC affiliate KTUL (channel 8), PBS station KOED-TV (channel 11, a satellite of the state-run OETA member network), CW affiliate KQCW-DT (channel 19), Fox affiliate KOKI-TV (channel 23), MyNetworkTV affiliate KMYT-TV (channel 41), Ion Television owned-and-operated station KTPX-TV (channel 44). The market is also home to several religious stations including TBN owned-and-operated station KDOR-TV (channel 17), religious/secular independent station KWHB (channel 47), and Oral Roberts University-owned KGEB (channel 53, which is distributed nationwide via satellite as GEB America).

Cable television service in the area is provided by Cox Communications, which acquired Tele-Communications Inc. (TCI)'s franchise rights to the area in a $2.85 billion deal (which also included the purchase of AT&T Broadband's Louisiana cable systems, minority ownership of TCA Cable TV systems in Texas, Louisiana and New Mexico, and TCI's Peak Cablevision systems in four other Oklahoma cities, and select markets in Arkansas, Utah and Nevada) in July 1999; Cox assumed control of TCI's Tulsa-area systems on March 15, 2000.

Infrastructure

Transportation

Transportation in Tulsa is aided by Tulsa Transit's bus network of 97 vehicles and two primary airports, while the Tulsa Port of Catoosa provides transportation of goods and industry through international trade routes. Though internal transportation is largely dependent on automobiles, the city was ranked in 2005 among the five least expensive metropolitan areas for average price of gas at the pump.

Highways
Tulsa has an extensive highway system that connects many cities in the region such as Joplin, Missouri on the Will Rogers Turnpike and Oklahoma City on the Turner Turnpike. Most commuters use the highway system in Tulsa to get to and from work. Highways that run through Tulsa are I-44, I-244, US-412, US-169, OK-66, US-64, US-75, OK-11, OK-51, Creek Turnpike, and Gilcrease Expressway. In 2011, the Oklahoma Department of Transportation reported that Tulsa's busiest freeway was US-169 with about 121,500 vehicles daily between 51st and 61st Streets, and its second busiest freeway was OK-51 with about 104,200 vehicles between Memorial and I-44.  Surrounding Downtown is the Inner Dispersal Loop (sometimes called the "I-D-L"), which connects Downtown with almost all the highways in Tulsa.

Buses
Tulsa Transit, the city's transit bus operator, runs 97 buses on 19 different routes across Tulsa and in surrounding suburbs such as Broken Arrow, Sand Springs and Jenks. Tulsa Transit has two stations: the Memorial Midtown Station at 7952 E. 33rd St. in Midtown Tulsa, and the Denver Avenue Station at 319 S. Denver, across from the BOK Center in Downtown. Most routes go through one or both of the stations, facilitating the commute to work and events in Downtown or Midtown. Buses stop at specific stops such as Tulsa Community College, Oklahoma State University-Tulsa, CityPlex Towers, Cox Communications, the various medical facilities in Tulsa, and many shopping destinations, hotels, and schools. The bus schedules are periodically changed; votes are taken by Tulsa Transit to help decide the particulars of certain routes.  Tulsa debuted its first bus rapid transit line, Aero on Peoria Avenue, in November 2019. The service has more frequent buses, upgraded stations, and faster travel times.

Intercity bus service is provided by both Greyhound Lines and Jefferson Lines.  The station for both is at 317 S. Detroit, five blocks from Tulsa Transit's Downtown bus terminal.  As to private chartered bus companies, Red Carpet Charters a/k/a Red Carpet Trailways of Tulsa, is an independent member of the Trailways Charter Bus Network.

Airports
Tulsa International Airport, which has service on thirteen commercial airlines (nine passenger and four cargo ones), serves more than three million travelers annually, with almost 80 departures every day. In 2007, the airport completed most of an expansion project, which included larger terminal sizes and the addition of restaurants and shops. In 2011, the airport opened the newly renovated Concourse B, complete with skylights, open gate holds, an average of 76 ways to charge a device per gate, and much more. Concourse A is under renovation. Richard L. Jones Jr. Airport, a/k/a Jones-Riverside Airport, a general aviation airport in West Tulsa, saw 335,826 takeoffs and landings in 2008, making it the busiest airport in Oklahoma and the fifth-busiest general aviation airport in the nation. The Tulsa Airports Improvement Trust also manages the Okmulgee Regional Airport in Okmulgee, Oklahoma, further to the south of Tulsa.

Railways
Freight railways bisect the city in every direction; the state's chief freight rail transporter is BNSF, which operates the Cherokee Rail Yard in Tulsa, which includes a freight terminal, diesel shop and hump yard for railcar sorting.  Other Class I transporters are Union Pacific Railroad, and Kansas City Southern Railway (via a short-line switch on the South Kansas and Oklahoma Railroad).

Tulsa Union Depot served Frisco, M-K-T and Santa Fe passenger trains until the 1960s. The Santa Fe continued at another station to 1971.  There are no mass transit rail lines in Tulsa, but the prospect of passenger rail lines from Downtown Tulsa to the suburb of Broken Arrow is being studied.  

Long-distance passenger rail transportation today serves Tulsa only through Greyhound bus lines, which provide bus connections to nearby cities with Amtrak stations.   Beginning in February 2014, a limited number of test trips of the Eastern Flyer were run, connecting the Tulsa and Oklahoma City metros via train on Sundays. The private passenger operation by the Iowa Pacific was at one point scheduled for regular daily operations from May 2014, but never started; Iowa Pacific later dropped out of the process.  Due to contractual provisions of its 2014 purchase from the State of Oklahoma of the “Sooner Sub” trackage running from Sapulpa, Oklahoma near Tulsa to Del City, Oklahoma near Oklahoma City, the Stillwater Central Railroad was obligated to start such a service by August 2019.  On August 5, 2019, the Stillwater Central opted to instead default under the agreement and pay the contractual $2.8 million in penalties for not establishing the service.

Tulsa has two static displays of antique steam railroad locomotives for free public viewing: the 1917 wood-burning Dierks Forest 207, a Baldwin 2-6-2 Prairie-type located at the Tulsa State Fairgrounds; and the 1942 oil-burning Frisco Meteor 4500, a Baldwin 4-8-4 Northern-type at the Route 66 Historical Village at 3770 Southwest Blvd.

Port of Catoosa

At the head of the McClellan-Kerr Arkansas River Navigation System, the Tulsa Port of Catoosa is an inland port in the United States and connects barge traffic from Tulsa to the Mississippi River via the Verdigris River and the Arkansas River. The facility is one of the largest riverports in the United States and contributes to one of the busiest waterways in the world via its course to the Gulf of Mexico.

Medical facilities

The Saint Francis Health System owns several hospitals with a central location at Saint Francis Hospital in the southern part of the city. The facility contains 700 doctors and 918 beds, and with more than 7,000 employees, the network is the second-largest healthcare employer in the state. The health system also operates a heart hospital, which was named by General Electric in 2004 one of the most advanced heart hospitals in the nation. St. John Medical Center, located in an 11-story midtown center, employs nearly 700 doctors. Other networks, such as Hillcrest Health System, operate a number of facilities of various sizes. Beginning in 2007, the city elected to renew a five-year contract with EMSA for ambulance service after a period spent contemplating a switch to the Tulsa Fire Department for the provision of such services.

In popular culture
 Several films starring Brat Pack actors were filmed in Tulsa in the early 1980s; among them were Tex (1982), The Outsiders (1983), Rumble Fish (1983), That Was Then... This Is Now (1985) and Fandango (1985).
 "Tampa to Tulsa" song by The Jayhawks
 Most of the HBO TV series Watchmen (2019) takes place in Tulsa.
 "Twenty Four Hours from Tulsa" song by Gene Pitney
 "Tulsa Time" song by Don Williams
 "Tulsa Jesus Freak" song by Lana Del Rey
 Tulsa King TV series starring Sylvester Stallone (2022)

Notable people

Sister cities

In accordance with the Tulsa Global Alliance, which operates in conjunction with Sister Cities International, an organization that began under President Dwight Eisenhower in 1956, Tulsa has been given nine international sister cities in an attempt to foster cross-cultural understanding:

Ploiești, Romania
Amiens, France
Celle, Germany
Beihai, China
Kaohsiung, Taiwan
San Luis Potosí, Mexico
Tiberias, Israel
Utsunomiya, Japan
Zelenograd, Russia

See also
 Tulsa (book)
 Tulsa (movie)
 List of oil refineries
 Tulsa race massacre
 USS Tulsa, 3 ships

Notes

References

External links

 Official website
 Vision 2025

 
1836 establishments in Indian Territory
Cities in Oklahoma
Cities in Osage County, Oklahoma
Cities in Rogers County, Oklahoma
Cities in Tulsa County, Oklahoma
Cities in Wagoner County, Oklahoma
County seats in Oklahoma
Inland port cities and towns of the United States
Populated places established in 1836
Oklahoma populated places on the Arkansas River
Tulsa metropolitan area